Adde may refer to:

People
 Adde Gabow, Somali politician
 Aden Adde, Somali politician
 Jean Renaud Adde (born 1970), French equestrian
 Leo Adde (1904–1942), American jazz drummer
 Nur Adde, also known as Nur Hassan Hussein, Somali politician
 Yannick Adde (born 1969), French sailor

Places
 El Adde, Somalia

Other
 ADDE, Alliance for Direct Democracy in Europe